Microphysogobio labeoides is a species of cyprinid fish endemic to China, Laos, and Vietnam.

References

Microphysogobio
Fish described in 1927